Vince Dean (born January 7, 1959) is an American politician and a Republican member of the Tennessee House of Representatives for the 30th district, which encompasses part of Hamilton County.

Education and career

Vince Dean was first elected as a state representative to the 104th Tennessee General Assembly (2005–2006) and was re-elected to the 105th General Assembly. He serves on the House State and Local Government Committee, the House Transportation Committee, the House State Government Subcommittee, and the House Public Transportation & Highways Subcommittee.

Previously, he has served as a three-term city council member in East Ridge, Tennessee, as Chair of the Tennessee Municipal League, and as a Tennessee Municipal League Board member. Vince Dean is a retired police officer and a retired mayor of East Ridge. He graduated from Baylor High School and attended University of Tennessee at Chattanooga and Cleveland State University.

References

Republican Party members of the Tennessee House of Representatives
University of Tennessee at Chattanooga alumni
Cleveland State University alumni
1959 births
Living people